The 1996 FIBA Europe Under-18 Championship was an international basketball  competition held in France in 1996.

Final ranking

1. 

2. 

3. 

4. 

5. 

6. 

7. 

8. 

9. 

10. 

11. 

12.

Awards

External links
FIBA Archive

1996
1996–97 in European basketball
1996–97 in French basketball
International youth basketball competitions hosted by France